Mountain Crystal  is a 1949 Austrian-German historical drama film directed by Harald Reinl and featuring a cast of unknown actors including Franz Eichberger, Hans Renz and Cilli Greif. It is a mountain film based on a novella of the same title by Adalbert Stifter. The film's sets were designed by the Austrian art director Fritz Jüptner-Jonstorff. It was the directorial debut of Reinl who went on to become a successful film director.

Plot
The Tyrolean mountain farmer's son Franz loves Sanna, the daughter of a dyer beyond the mountain ridge. His rival, a hunter, caught him poaching, shot him and left him wounded. The hunter then has a fatal accident in a crevasse, but the villagers consider Franz, who was seriously injured, to be the murderer of the missing hunter. Acquitted for lack of evidence, he is still outlawed by everyone. Only Sanna sticks to him, marries him and is therefore rejected by her father.

Franz is repeatedly confronted with the murder charge, which affects his whole life. Years later, his two children want to look for the Christ child at Christmas time because the bitter father does not tolerate a Christmas tree in his house. They get lost in the glacier region and find shelter in an ice cave, where the hunter's intact body is located. In a joint rescue operation, not only are the children rescued, but Franz is finally rehabilitated and finds his faith in God and the people again.

Cast
Franz Eichberger as Franz Valteiner
Hans Renz as Färber von Millsdorf
Cilli Greif as Färberin, dessen Frau
Maria Stolz as Sanna, beider Tochter
Michael Killisch-Horn as Konrad, Knabe
Hildegard Mayr as Sannele, Mädchen
Hans Thöni as Franz Valteiners Vater
Robert Falch as Der Jägersteffel

Production
Harald Reinl worked again with the producers Josef Plesner and Hubert Schonger to realize his first feature film, shot in winter 1948/49. Fritz Jüptner-Jonstorff was responsible for the buildings, the studio was in Kufstein. The exterior shots were taken in Kitzbühel, in the Kaiser Mountains, on the Tuxer Joch, at the Upper Court, and on the Spannagel Glacier. In addition to the actors mentioned by name, farmers, hunters, and shepherds from Tyrol also appear in the film. The premiere took place on the 22nd of October 1949 in Munich, Germany, followed by the screening in Vienna on December 23 the same year.

References

External links

Films directed by Harald Reinl
Mountaineering films
Films set in the Alps
Films set in the 19th century
Films about hunters
Films based on Austrian novels
German historical drama films
Austrian historical drama films
1940s historical drama films
German black-and-white films
Austrian black-and-white films
1949 drama films